LLQ may refer to:
 Low Latency Queuing
 Left lower quadrant
 Monticello Municipal Airport (Arkansas)
 DNS long lived queries